is a residential district of Minato, Tokyo, Japan. As of November 1, 2007, the total population is 152.

Education
Minato City Board of Education operates public elementary and junior high schools.

Azabu-Nagasakachō is zoned to Azabu Elementary School (麻布小学校) and Roppongi Junior High School (六本木中学校).

References

Districts of Minato, Tokyo